Euphaedra miranda is a butterfly in the family Nymphalidae. It is found in the Central African Republic, the western part of the Democratic Republic of the Congo and possibly Cameroon.

References

Butterflies described in 1984
miranda